Tony Kirkham MBE VMH is the former Head of Arboretum, Gardens & Horticulture Services, Royal Botanic Gardens, Kew.

Career
Born in Lancashire, Tony Kirkham moved to Surrey to become, aged 16, a forestry apprentice with Tilhill Forestry Nurseries.  After a time spent working in Hamburg learning about tree management within urban and park environments he moved to Kew to study the world-famous Diploma in Horticulture to broaden his knowledge in horticulture.

The only student to be offered a job at Kew upon graduation, he spent the next 14 years managing part of Kew's arboretum. During this time, he completed several plant collecting expeditions in East Asia, including South Korea, Taiwan, the Russian Far East and Sakhalin Island, China and Japan to add to Kew's collection and replace trees lost in the Great Storm of 1987.

After 43 years he retired from the post of Kew's Head of Arboretum, Gardens and Horticultural Services where he and his team managed 14,000 trees and shared their passion for trees with the visitors to Kew.  He is the author of four books and ran the "Treeathlon" to support the Trees for Cities campaign for more trees in urban areas in the UK, and says that “looking at trees anywhere in the world” is one of his hobbies.

Awards
In 2009 he was awarded the Associate of Honour by the RHS for his services to horticulture. Only 100 people to hold this award in the British Isles.

Named one of the most influential Londoners in the Evening Standard's Progress 1000: London's most influential people 2016

In 2015 he was awarded Honorary Lifetime fellow of the Arboricultural Association recognising the significant and positive impact he has made to Arboriculture.

William Aiton medal by Royal Botanic Garden's Kew in December 2016 for exceptional services to Kew.

In 2019 he was awarded the Victoria Medal of Honour (VMH). The award was established in 1897 "in perpetual remembrance of Her Majesty's glorious reign, and to enable the RHS Council to confer honour on British horticulturists." Only sixty-three horticulturists can hold the VMH at any given time, in commemoration of the sixty-three years of Queen Victoria's reign.

He was also awarded the MBE in the Queen's New Years Honours list in 2019 for services to the Royal Botanic Gardens, Kew and Arboriculture.

In 2022 the Institute of Chartered Foresters (ICF) awarded him with an honorary fellowship in recognition of his service to the advancement of arboricultural knowledge.

Kirkham sits on many professional committees including the International Dendrology Society, Trees and Shrubs Online committee, Council at the RHS, plus the awards committee and is chair of the RHS woody plant committee.

Trustee of the Tree Register of Britain and Ireland (TROBI), and trustee of the Chelsea Physic Garden where he also serves as the Chairman of the Advisory Committee.

References

Further reading 
Author or co-author of eight books:

 The Pruning of Trees, Shrubs and Conifers 
 Essential Pruning Techniques
 Plants from the Edge of the World: New Explorations in the Far East 
 Wilson's China: A Century On
 The Haynes Workshop Manual on Trees
 Remarkable Trees
 Growing Trees in the Kew Gardens series
 Arboretum

Interviews 
(New York Times)
The Indiana Jones of Plants

(BBC)
The oldest living thing on Earth

(The Telegraph)
Climate change: why we need to change our taste in trees 

Botanists active in Kew Gardens
Living people
1957 births
Victoria Medal of Honour recipients